Roy Albert James Shiner (15 November 1924 in Ryde, Isle of Wight – 1988) was a professional footballer who played as a forward for Ryde Sports, Cheltenham Town, Huddersfield Town, Sheffield Wednesday & Hull City. He later went on to manage clubs on the Isle of Wight such as Newport (IOW), Seaview and St. Helens.
During the period 1946 - 1951 whilst I (Roger Edwards) was the team mascot, Roy Shiner played regularly for Ryde Sports as a centre forward. During this period Ryde Sports won the Hampshire League Gold Cup; which was paraded through the town on the roof of the team coach.

Shiner joined Huddersfield in December 1951 as a replacement for Ronnie Burke at centre-forward and made his debut on Christmas Day. He played in eight further matches that season but for the next three years he was used mainly as a replacement when another forward was injured. Always an enthusiastic and vigorous player, he made a total of only 21 first-team appearances in three and a half seasons at Huddersfield, scoring six goals.

He moved to Sheffield Wednesday along with Ron Staniforth in the summer of 1955 where his career blossomed. In four seasons there he made 153 appearances and scored 93 goals. He then spent a season at Hull City.

References 
99 Years and Counting - Huddersfield Town Centenary History by A.Hodgson, G.&I. Thomas and J.Ward, Huddersfield Town AFC, 2007

1924 births
1988 deaths
People from Ryde
English footballers
Association football forwards
English Football League players
Ryde Sports F.C. players
Cheltenham Town F.C. players
Huddersfield Town A.F.C. players
Sheffield Wednesday F.C. players
Hull City A.F.C. players
Newport (IOW) F.C. managers
English football managers